The Judge Charles P. McCarthy House is a two-story Prairie school duplex which was constructed in Boise, Idaho in 1913.  It was adapted from a Frank Lloyd Wright design published in the April 1907 edition of Ladies Home Journal Magazine, where readers could purchase plans for a flat rate, or have them customized by Wright's office for a 10% premium. It appears as a classic prairie-style design with horizontal design elements, including a low-pitch roof with deep hipped roof overhangs.

The house was individually listed on the National Register of Historic Places in 1979. It was included as a contributing property in the Hays Street Historic District in 1982.

References

External links
McCarthy house on waymarking.com
7 Wonders of Boise

Houses completed in 1913
Houses in Boise, Idaho
National Register of Historic Places in Boise, Idaho
Houses on the National Register of Historic Places in Idaho
Individually listed contributing properties to historic districts on the National Register in Idaho
Frank Lloyd Wright buildings